William G. Enloe High School, also known as Enloe Magnet High School or Enloe High School, is a public magnet high school offering Gifted & Talented and International Baccalaureate programs located in eastern Raleigh, North Carolina, United States. It is operated under the Wake County Public School System. The first integrated public high school in the city of Raleigh, it was named after William Gilmore Enloe, the Mayor of Raleigh at the time the school was opened.

History
William G. Enloe High School was originally organized as two different schools that shared athletic facilities between adjacent campuses—William G. Enloe Senior High School (named after Raleigh Mayor William G. Enloe) and Charles B. Aycock Junior High. The original Enloe campus was opened in 1962 as the first integrated secondary school in Raleigh for the education of students participating in grades seven through twelve and served as the secondary educational institution for the Longview Gardens community. Enloe's mixed population was drawn from the white student body at Broughton High School and the black one at Ligon Middle School. It was deemed undesirable to pull Broughton's upcoming seniors out, so Enloe had only 160 juniors for its highest class out of a student body of 910 during its first year.  George A. Kahdy was the school's first principal. He held the post for five years.

Three years after Enloe opened, Aycock was created on an adjacent campus as a junior high school to educate students in the seventh through ninth grades, taking the place of recently shuttered Hugh Morson Junior High. Enloe became a senior high school with concentrated education for grades ten through twelve. In 1973, Enloe became the first fully integrated high school in Raleigh and the first fully integrated high school to hire a black principal. Enloe absorbed the Aycock campus in 1979, becoming a modern high school focused on educating ninth through twelfth grade students. The Aycock building became the East Building, while the original Enloe complex became the West Building.

In 1980, Enloe began providing magnet courses for "gifted and talented" students in Wake County. Around 300 students participated in the first two years of the program's existence. The school was promoted to full magnet status in 1982. Until the mid-1990s, Enloe was the only magnet high school in the Wake County Public School System, leading to a high concentration of academically talented students. The 1993 graduating class included 42 National Merit Semifinalists, a number that remains a state record.

In July 1997, Enloe became an IB World School, allowing students to pursue the challenging International Baccalaureate Programme. Enloe IB students are occasionally invited to attend special events or trips through their involvement in the IB Programme. Enloe IB students participated in exchanges with high schools in China (2004–2005) and Germany, and started a relationship with students at a high school in Turkey through the use of video conferencing technology (2005–2006).

Enloe was the first high school in the state of North Carolina to accommodate a student Gay-Straight Alliance.

In 2006, Enloe finished the construction of a new building adjacent to the West Campus and consequently closed the 50-year-old, outdated East Campus for renovation. Almost all of the classes migrated from the East Campus to the new building, reducing the need to share classes with its larger capacity. The East Campus was reopened on January 22, 2008, at the start of the second semester. It included autotech classes, the new East Gym, student services, healthful living classrooms, and other classrooms. The next stage of Enloe's renovation was completed in January 2009, and involved the locker rooms in the West Gym being converted to house the audio-visual classrooms as well as the television studio.

The Wake County School Board considered removing the International Baccalaureate and magnet status from Enloe in 2008, but this decision was overturned due to the intense lobbying of students and their parents.

On June 29, 2010, historian Timothy Tyson and North Carolina NAACP President William Barber II spoke before the Wake County Public School System Board about racial segregation, arguing that Mayor William G. Enloe had been in favor of it. As result, the school board announced it would review its school naming policy. Many students and alumni from Enloe High School feared the name of the school would be altered, and quickly organized to protest any potential moves to do so. Wake County Commissioner Stan Norwalk accused the school board of attempting to retaliate against Enloe students for opposing its decision to eliminate the county's diversity policy. NAACP officials later clarified that the mentioning of Enloe was intended to bring in historical context, and that they did not desire for the school's name to be changed. In the face of growing criticism, board member John Todesco stated that the board would not remove Enloe's name from the school unless something "horrid" about him was uncovered.

As of 2016, Enloe had 35 AP courses and 24 IB courses.

In between March 14 and 15, 2019 the school was vandalized with racist and homophobic graffiti. Some of the messages were targeted at the school's principal, William Chavis. The damage was discovered on the morning of March 15 and school officials had the messages covered.

Evangelist controversy
In February 2007, the school came under fire from Muslim advocacy groups and the American Civil Liberties Union after history teacher Robert Escamilla invited Kamil Solomon, a Coptic Christian Evangelist and head of Kamil International Ministries, to speak about his experiences with Christianity and Muslims. The Council on American Islamic Relations and parents of Muslim and secular students accused the school of breaching federal civil rights laws and promoting hate in a public school.
Escamilla was suspended with pay for 90 days while the school district investigated the complaint. He was later transferred to an alternative school and reprimanded by Superintendent Del Burns. In addition, Burns apologized to Muslims for Solomon's visit. He subsequently issued new guidelines that require guest speakers to sign forms saying they will not denigrate any culture, race, gender, national origin or religion. Escamilla appealed the punishment, but the grievance was rejected by the school board. In a controversial move, the school board voted to release part of Escamilla's confidential personnel file to justify its decision. Escamilla filed a lawsuit asking to be transferred back to Enloe. Escamilla and the school district reached a settlement in which Wake agreed not to punish him any further over the Evangelist controversy.

Charity ball
In 2004, Enloe High School began hosting a "Charity Ball" and raising money in connection with the dance for local philanthropic causes. By 2019 the school had raised over $1 million for charitable causes.

Demographics

Student body

In the 2008–2009 school year, Enloe had approximately 2,640 enrolled students.  Of this population, 12% were of Asian descent. The remainder of Enloe's student population were composed of students with ancestries of White (42%), African (35%), and Hispanic (9%) descent.

At the beginning of the 2015–2016 school year, a cap was placed on Enloe's enrollment at 2,650 to prevent overcrowding. As of 2016, Enloe had 2,610 enrolled students. Of those, 38% were African American/Black, 29% were Caucasian/White, 18% were Asian/Pacific Islander, 12% were Hispanic/Latino, 4% were multi-ethnic, and less than 1% were Native American. This cap was removed prior to the 2019–2020 school year.

Graduation rate
Enloe's graduation rate is above the county average. In the 2018–19 school year, 93.7% of Enloe students graduated in four years, compared to 89.9% of all Wake County high school students, according to the N.C. Department of Public Instruction.

Poverty
During the 2013–2014 school year, 32% of Enloe's students were eligible for free lunch and another 4% qualified for reduced-price lunch. As of November 2015, Enloe worked with about 75 families designated homeless as per the McKinney–Vento Homeless Assistance Act. Principal Scott Lyons petitioned Wake County Public School System for the transfer of an additional social worker from a less disadvantaged school to help address the problem.

Faculty and staff
There were 148 members of the Enloe teaching staff in 2006, and many support personnel were employed in administration, guidance and similar positions. Twenty-five members were certified by the National Board for Professional Teaching Standards and 39% possessed an advanced degree (Masters or PhD) in their respective fields.

During the 2015–2016 school year, Enloe employed 210 staff members, of whom 157 were classroom teachers. Twenty-four were certified by the National Board for Professional Teaching Standards, 78 had an advanced degree, and 19 had over 25 years of teaching experience.

Science and technology

From 1994 to 1995, Enloe teachers were trained in the use of computers and technology. Instruction occurred in two phases. The first phase involved basic computer skills, word processing, data management, email, and multimedia (including handling of laserdisc players, Quicktake cameras, and camcorders), while the second focused on educating teachers on technology that could be specifically applied to their curriculum.

In 2008, a team from Enloe won the Team America Rocketry Challenge.

Arts, humanities, and social sciences
As of 1997, Enloe had the largest arts facilities of any school in Wake County. The school was one of only three high schools in the United States to host a production of the play Miss Saigon in the Spring of 2015.

As of 2011, Enloe was the only school in the state to offer a Russian language course.

Enloe is a host to several clubs within the field of Social Sciences; including Model United Nations, Speech and Debate, and Mock Trial. The school is also known for offering AP/IB courses within the social sciences field, such as AP Comparative Government and Politics, IB Global Politics, AP Psychology, and IB Philosophy.

Media and publications

Newspaper
The student newspaper, The Eagle's Eye, has been in circulation since the 1960s. The first attempt to publish the paper failed. In 1966, the paper briefly lost the financial support of the student body. In response, the staff stopped distributing the publication freely and renamed it Enloe News. By 1968, the change had been reverted. In 1998 senior Matt Williams, an editor on the paper, sold ad space to the North Carolina Lambda Youth Network, a self-described leadership development group for lesbian, gay, bisexual and straight young people. Principal Lloyd Gardner objected to the wording and potential political message that the ad could convey. Students argued that they should publish it on the basis of being allowed to run a Christian group's ad in a previous edition. Gardner responded by banning the Christian ad from being run a second time. Williams appealed both decisions to the Wake County Public School System's board. The censorship was unanimously upheld by a three-member panel, which asserted that the county policy allowed the principal to make final decisions regarding school publications.

Recently, the Eagle's Eye has switched from print publishing to publishing its articles online through the newspaper's site, enloenews.org.

Unofficial publications
In the fall of 1992, students founded an independent newspaper, Vanguard. Taking in submissions from students, it was seen as an alternative to The Eagle's Eye, which some students thought did not fully address controversial topics of the time. Principal Bobby Allen found a series of jokes in one article offensive and asserted that he could review each monthly issue before its release, as per county policy. He also maintained that if the content were inappropriate it could not be distributed on campus. A student argued that the review process would interfere with the paper's printing schedule and infringe upon students' first amendment rights, and appealed to the American Civil Liberties Union (ACLU) for assistance. In May 1994, the ACLU filed a lawsuit against the public school system on behalf of the paper's editors. After months of negotiation, the school board reached a settlement whereby students could publish free from prior review as long they did not distribute during class. In 1995, two other independent newspapers, Glass Butterfly and Spare Ribs, were published at the school. Vanguard ceased publication several years later.

Magazine
Enloe's original student literary magazine, Image, was first published in 1964 and was issued at least through 1968. A succeeding publication, Stone Soup, has been in circulation since the 1980s.

Television
Enloe also has its own control room and broadcast desk where students produce the school's live television news show, the 'Loe Down. It has won numerous National Academy Television Student Awards for the Nashville Midsouth Chapter.

Through its video and audio production classes, Enloe High School has also gained multiple  Student Emmys. This includes two awards and six nominations since 2012.

Athletics

Enloe's sports image was designed by the Broughton sophomores allotted to attend the school their junior year in 1962. During a meeting in Broughton's gymnasium, it was decided that the mascot would be an eagle, the colors would be the same as the Green Bay Packers', the football helmets would be all gold in the style of the University of Notre Dame's Fighting Irish, and the fight song would be University of Michigan's The Victors.

Enloe's current sports teams are as follows:

 Football
 Cheerleading
 Men's and women's basketball
 Men's and women's lacrosse
 Baseball
 Softball
 Men's and women's tennis
 Men's and women's golf
 Gymnastics
 Men's and women's swimming & diving
 Men's and women's track & field
 Men's and women's cross country
 Men's and women's soccer
 Volleyball
 Wrestling

The men's swimming & diving team won nine consecutive state championships from 1999 to 2007 and had additional wins in conference and regional championships.

Enloe's historical rival in athletics is Broughton High School.

Rankings and awards

Enloe was recognized in 2014 as a School of Distinction by Magnet Schools of America.

For the 2014–2015 school year, Enloe's graduating class received over $15.4 million in scholarships, the highest of any high school in the Wake County Public School System.

As of 2021, the U.S. News & World Report ranks Enloe was ranked 2138th in the nation, 60th in North Carolina, and 207th in the nation for magnet schools.

In 2016, according to The Washington Post, Enloe ranked seventh in the state and 280th nationally for most challenging high schools.

Notable alumni

References

External links 
 Enloe High School website

African-American history in Raleigh, North Carolina
Gifted education
International Baccalaureate schools in North Carolina
Magnet schools in North Carolina
Public high schools in North Carolina
Schools in Raleigh, North Carolina
Schools of the performing arts in the United States
Wake County Public School System
Educational institutions established in 1962
1962 establishments in North Carolina